Alexander Pulalo (born 8 May 1973) is a retired Indonesian professional footballer who played as a full-back.

Honours

Club
PSM Makassar
 Liga Indonesia: 1999–2000

Arema Malang
 Copa Indonesia: 2005, 2006

International
Indonesia
 AFF Championship third place: 1998

External links

1973 births
Living people
Papuan people
People from Jayapura
Indonesian footballers
2004 AFC Asian Cup players
Indonesian Christians
Indonesia international footballers
Association football defenders
Indonesian Premier Division players
Semen Padang F.C. players
Pelita Jaya FC players
PSM Makassar players
PSIS Semarang players
Persija Jakarta players
Persib Bandung players
Arema F.C. players
Mitra Kukar players
Sportspeople from Papua